Marcin Mięciel (born 22 December 1975) is a Polish former professional footballer who played as a striker. His trademark was the bicycle kick.

Career
Born in Gdynia, Mięciel started his football career at Wisła Tczew for which he played until 1990. The next stop in his career was Lechia Gdańsk. In December 1993 he transferred to Hutnik Warszawa but after only six months he moved on to local rivals Legia Warsaw where he played until 2001 (only interrupted by a half year loan to ŁKS Łódź in 1995).

After a disappointing season at Borussia Mönchengladbach Mięciel went on to Greece. His first stop was Iraklis Saloniki. After two and a half seasons, he moved to local rivals PAOK. He scored five goals in 13 games till the end of the 2004–05 season. In his second season, he scored five times in 25 matches. His most successful season was 2006–07: in 29 matches he notched 14 goals. He was one of the topscorers in the Greek league and PAOK's "most valuable player" of that season.

After his first disappointing attempt in the German Bundesliga with Borussia Mönchengladbach Mięciel returned for the 2007–08 season, this time to play for VfL Bochum. The transfer fee was estimated at €250,000. For the 2009–10 season he returned to Legia Warsaw on a free transfer. For the 2010–11 season he returned to ŁKS Łódź on a free transfer.

Honours
Legia Warsaw
 Ekstraklasa: 1994–95
 Polish Cup: 1994–95, 1996–97
 Polish Super Cup: 1994, 1997

ŁKS Łódź
 I liga: 2010–11

Individual
 Topscorer of PAOK: 2006–07
PAOK MVP of the Season: 2006–07

References

External links
 
 

Living people
1975 births
Sportspeople from Gdynia
Association football forwards
Lechia Gdańsk players
Legia Warsaw players
ŁKS Łódź players
Polish footballers
Poland international footballers
Polish expatriate footballers
Borussia Mönchengladbach players
Iraklis Thessaloniki F.C. players
PAOK FC players
VfL Bochum players
Ekstraklasa players
Bundesliga players
Super League Greece players
Expatriate footballers in Germany
Expatriate footballers in Greece
Hutnik Warsaw players